Nataliya Shtaymets (born 5 November 1963) is a Kazakhstani cross-country skier. She competed in two events at the 1994 Winter Olympics.

References

External links
 

1963 births
Living people
Kazakhstani female cross-country skiers
Olympic cross-country skiers of Kazakhstan
Cross-country skiers at the 1994 Winter Olympics
Place of birth missing (living people)